Gerhard Kroschewski (born 16 February 1956) is a German rower. He competed in the men's double sculls event at the 1976 Summer Olympics.

References

1956 births
Living people
German male rowers
Olympic rowers of West Germany
Rowers at the 1976 Summer Olympics
Sportspeople from Kassel